Methyloferula stellata is a Gram-negative and non-motile bacteria from the genus of Methyloferula which has been isolated from acidic peat soil from Arkhangelsk in Russia. In contrast to most known Methanotrophs Methyloferula stellata is an aerobic acidophilic methanotroph. This makes it similar to Methylocella species, however it is unable to grow on multicarbon substrates. It's genome was sequenced in March and April 2015.

References

External links
Type strain of Methyloferula stellata at BacDive -  the Bacterial Diversity Metadatabase	
Draft Genome Sequence of Methyloferula stellata AR4, an Obligate Methanotroph Possessing Only a Soluble Methane Monooxygenase

Beijerinckiaceae
Bacteria described in 2011